Donald Carl Pogue (May 24, 1947 – October 26, 2016) was a United States Judge of the United States Court of International Trade and served as Chair of the Court's Long Range Planning Committee and Budget Committee. He was appointed to the Trade Court in 1995 by President Bill Clinton.

Biography

Education
Pogue was born in 1947 in Macomb, Illinois. Pogue is a magna cum laude Phi Beta Kappa graduate of Dartmouth College, where he received a Bachelor of Arts degree, with highest honors in government, and has done graduate work at the University of Essex, England. He received a Juris Doctor from Yale Law School and a Masters of Arts in philosophy from Yale University.

Career
Pogue engaged in private practice in New Haven, Connecticut, from 1974 to 1975 and in Hartford, Connecticut, from 1976 to 1989 with the law firm of Kestell, Pogue & Gould. He served as Director of the Connecticut branch of the American Federation of State, County and Municipal Employees from 1975 to 1976. He served as an Adjunct Lecturer on labor law at the University of Connecticut School of Law from 1979 to 1982 and assisted in teaching the Harvard Law School's program on negotiations and dispute resolution for lawyers. He served as Commissioner and Chairman of the Connecticut Commissions of Hospitals and Health Care from 1989 to 1994. He served as a Judge of the Connecticut Superior Court from 1994 to 1995, presiding over criminal court in New Haven, Connecticut.

Trade Court service
On June 30, 1995, President Clinton nominated Pogue to serve as a United States Judge of the United States Court of International Trade, to the seat vacated by Judge James Lopez Watson. He was confirmed by the Senate on August 11, 1995 and received his commission on August 14, 1995. He served as Chief Judge of the Court from 2010-2014. He assumed senior status on July 1, 2014, and served in that status until his death on October 26, 2016.

References

External links
FJC Bio
Senior Judge Donald C. Pogue Biography on U.S. Court of International Trade website

1947 births
2016 deaths
Connecticut state court judges
Dartmouth College alumni
Yale Law School alumni
Alumni of the University of Essex
Judges of the United States Court of International Trade
People from Macomb, Illinois
Lawyers from New Haven, Connecticut
Superior court judges in the United States
American Federation of State, County and Municipal Employees people
20th-century American judges
20th-century American lawyers
United States federal judges appointed by Bill Clinton